The anthem of the Sucre State, Venezuela, has lyrics written by Ramón David León; the music was added by Benigno Rodríguez Bruzual.

Lyrics in Spanish Language

Chorus 
¡Pueblo altivo! Blasona la Historia 
de tus hijos la gesta marcial,
te da Sucre su nombre de gloria 
y Ayacucho su lauro inmortal.

I 
Tres cuarteles tu Escudo prestigian,
y en el oro, el zafir y escarlata 
de tu pueblo figuran la grata 
armonía de dones de paz; 
en el cuerno colmado de frutos, 
la bondad prodigiosa del suelo, 
y en la palma que se alza hacia el cielo, 
¡heroísmo, virtud, libertad!

II 
El dorado esplendor de tus playas 
es promesa de pan  
como es tu pasado glorioso, 
de un futuro de pródigo bien; 
la más bella porción de Oriente 
en fronteras cordiales encierras 
y es silvestre en tus pródigas tierras 
el prestigio marcial del laurel.

III 
En ti se une por gracia remota 
el laurel al olivo sagrado, 
convertiste la espada en arado 
y tus dianas en himnos de amor. 
Como en cumbre eminente culmina 
de tus pueblos la fama procera, 
y es el nombre de Sucre, bandera 
en perenne demanda de ¡Unión!

See also
 List of anthems of Venezuela

References

Anthems of Venezuela
Spanish-language songs